Leslie DeWitt Stauffer (April 3, 1888 – July 6, 1963) was an American football player and coach. He served as the head football coach at the University of Chattanooga from 1910 to 1913, compiling a record of 16–11–1. Stauffer died on July 6, 1963, at his home in Birmingham, Michigan.

Head coaching record

References

External links
 

1888 births
1963 deaths
Chattanooga Mocs football coaches
Chattanooga Mocs men's basketball coaches
Ohio Wesleyan Battling Bishops football players
People from Bellevue, Ohio
Players of American football from Ohio